Pauline Michel (born 1944 in Asbestos, Quebec) is a Canadian novelist, poet, playwright, songwriter and screenwriter.

Michel has a Bachelor of Education from the Université de Sherbrooke as well a teaching certificate from École normale Marguerite Bourgeois and Université Laval.

Her work has appeared on Radio-Canada, Télé-Métropole, TV Ontario and Télé-Québec.

In 2004, Michel was appointed the second ever Canadian Parliamentary Poet Laureate, succeeding George Bowering. She served as Poet Laureate until November 16, 2006.

References

External links 
 Pauline Michel at the Parliament of Canada website

1944 births
Canadian women dramatists and playwrights
Canadian women novelists
Canadian women poets
Canadian Parliamentary Poets Laureate
Canadian women screenwriters
Canadian songwriters
Canadian poets in French
Living people
People from Val-des-Sources
Writers from Quebec
20th-century Canadian poets
21st-century Canadian poets
20th-century Canadian dramatists and playwrights
21st-century Canadian dramatists and playwrights
20th-century Canadian women writers
21st-century Canadian women writers
Canadian novelists in French
Canadian dramatists and playwrights in French
Canadian screenwriters in French